Akanksha Singh (born 7 September 1989 in Varanasi Uttar Pradesh) is an Indian basketball player and captain of the India Women's National Basketball Team.She has played for the national team since 2004. She and her sisters, Divya, Prashanti, and Pratima are known as the "fantastic four" of the Indian women's basketballers, and are also known as the "Singh Sisters".

Playing career 

In 2003, Akanksha Singh made her debut in the Senior Nationals and played for the Uttar Pradesh team when she was just an 11th grader. In 2004, she followed her sisters' footsteps on the Delhi team. In 2010, Akanksha was awarded the Most Valuable Player in India's first professional basketball league, the MPBL. Her name was forever cemented in the Indian basketball history books as one of the first-ever top four players to achieve the "A Grade" from the Basketball Federation of India sponsored by IMG Reliance. She is often called the "small wonder" in basketball.

She has been awarded Best Player in many national and state championships. In her captaincy at the University of Delhi, she won a gold medal in the All India University basketball championship at Nellore, where she was given joint best player award along with her sister Pratima Singh.

Personal life
Singh comes from a family of basketball players. She completed her undergraduate studies at St. Stephen’s College, Delhi.  Her sisters Divya, Prashanti, and Pratima have represented the Indian National Women's Basketball Team. Oldest among the sisters is Priyanka, who is a National Institute of Sports basketball coach.  Sister Divya worked with the University of Delaware basketball team. Her brother Vikrant Solanki is a football player In the I-league and Santosh Trophy competitions.

Awards and achievements

 Awarded as one of the best four ‘A grade players’ across the country in women's basketball in India
 May 2010 - Most Valuable Player in first All India Mastan Basketball Professional League held at Mumbai, Maharashtra
 May 2010 - Best Player Award in the league match in MBPL, Mumbai, Maharashtra
 2008 - Most Valuable Player in All India Inter University Basketball Tournament held at Nellore, Andhra Pradesh
 2008 - Best Player Award in Lady Shri Ram College for Women, New Delhi
 September 2006 - Best Player Award in XXXII St. Stephens College invitational basketball tournament held at St. Stephen's College, Delhi
 September 2005 - Best Player Award in XXXI St. Stephens College invitational basketball tournament held at St. Stephens College, Delhi

International sporting achievements

 Asian Games 2014 Incheon, KOREA, 19 September to 4 October 2014
 34th Williams Jones Cup invitational tournament 2012, Miaoli county, Taiwan
 25th FIBA Asian Basketball Championship for senior women, 2011, Nagasaki, Japan
 33rd William Jones Cup  2011, Hsinchuang Gymnasium, Chinese Taipei
 Asian Games 2010 Guangzhou, China, 12 November to 27 November 2010
 24th FIBA Asian Basketball Championship for Senior Women, 2009, Chennai, India	
 23rd FIBA Asian Basketball Championship for Senior Women, 2007, Korea	
 18th FIBA Asian Basketball Championship for Junior Women 2007, Bangkok, Thailand
 2nd FIBA Asian Basketball Championship for Young Women, 2006, Singapore
 17th FIBA Asian Basketball Championship for Junior Women, 2004, Shenzhen, China
 Indian Camp for 21st FIBA Asian Basketball Championship for Senior Women, 2005, Qinhuangdao City, China

References

1989 births
Living people
Sportswomen from Uttar Pradesh
Indian women's basketball players
Basketball players from Varanasi
Basketball players at the 2010 Asian Games
Basketball players at the 2014 Asian Games
21st-century Indian women
21st-century Indian people
Asian Games competitors for India
Guards (basketball)
Singh sisters